The Nova Rock Festival, also just Nova Rock, is an Austrian rock festival that has existed since 2005 and takes place each year in June. It is located in Burgenland, the easternmost federal state of Austria, near Nickelsdorf and the Hungarian and Slovak borders. It is organized by Nova Music Entertainment, a cooperation between Musicnet, FKP Scorpio and several former employees/bookers of Wiesen, who left Wiesen in 2004.

2005 lineup 
Die Ärzte, Audioslave, Bad Acid Trip, Beatsteaks, BoySetsFire, Core, Green Day, In Extremo, La Vela Puerca, Mando Diao, Marilyn Manson, Moneybrother, Nightwish, The Prodigy, Soulfly, System of a Down, Weezer, Wir sind Helden

2006 lineup 
The 2006 Nova Rock festival was held from 15 to 17 June (Thursday to Saturday). It was the first year that the festival had two large stages (blue and red).
The first bands announced on the Nova Rock homepage were:
Guns N' Roses, Placebo, Metallica, Tool, Queens of the Stone Age, Massive Attack, Motörhead, Madsen, Billy Talent, Hard-Fi, Guadalajara, Seeed, Bodyrockers, She Male Trouble,  Sportfreunde Stiller, Lagwagon, Subway to Sally and Julia.

Originally Korn were announced to play the festival, but had to cancel it, as well as the "Nova Rock Encore", a concert in Vienna which they were expected to play with Deftones, Soulfly and Devildriver.

2007 lineup 
Nova Rock Festival 2007 took place from 15 to 17 June with the following lineup:

Headliners: Billy Talent, The Smashing Pumpkins, Marilyn Manson, Pearl Jam, Slayer, The Killers,

The festival also consisted of bands including: Linkin Park, Machine Head, In Flames, Papa Roach, Reel Big Fish, Incubus, Mando Diao, The Hives, Me First and the Gimme Gimmes, Children of Bodom, Less Than Jake, Flogging Molly, Mastodon, Thirty Seconds to Mars, Isis, Aiden, In Extremo, Ill Niño, Within Temptation, Hayseed Dixie, The BossHoss and Chimaira.

2008 lineup 
Confirmed lineup:

2009 lineup 

Confirmed bands as of 4 April 2009:

2010 lineup 

Date: 11. - 13. June 2010
Confirmed bands as of 23 November 2009:

2011 lineup 

Date: 11. - 13. June 2011
Confirmed bands:

Special Late Night Attraction

2012 lineup 

Date: 08. - 10. June 2012
Confirmed bands:

Canceled due to storm.

2013 lineup 

Date: 14. - 16. June 2013
Confirmed bands:

2014 lineup 
Date: 13. - 15. June 2014

2015 lineup 
Date: 12. - 14. June 2015

2016 lineup 
Date: 10. - 12. June 2016

2017 lineup 

Date: 14. - 17. June 2017

2018 lineup 
Date: 14. - 17. June 2018

2019 lineup 
Date: 13. - 16. June 2019

External links 

 
 Nova Music's homepage

Rock festivals in Austria
Heavy metal festivals in Austria
Tourist attractions in Burgenland
Music festivals established in 2005